The Turnagain River is a river in the Canadian province of British Columbia.

The Turnagain River was named by Samuel Black of the Hudson's Bay Company, who in 1824 journeyed to the river before turning back. Part of the river flows through the Muskwa-Kechika Management Area.

Course
The Turnagain River flows generally east and north to join the Kechika River. The Kechika River is a tributary of the Liard River, which is in turn tributary to the Mackenzie River, which empties into the Arctic Ocean. A notable tributary is the Cassiar River, which flows north to joins the Turnagain southeast of Cry Lake and which was the focus of the Cassiar Gold Rush of the 1870s.  Other major tributaries are the Major Hart River and the Dall River.

See also
List of British Columbia rivers

References

Rivers of British Columbia
Cassiar Land District